The Great Seal of Northern Ireland is the seal used for Northern Ireland. The great seal is in the possession of the Secretary of State for Northern Ireland. The Great Seal was created by the Irish Free State (Consequential Provisions) Act 1922 on the creation of Northern Ireland for possession by the Governor of Northern Ireland to "be used for all matters in Northern Ireland for which the Great Seal of Ireland was theretofore used".

This remained until the imposition of direct rule in 1972, followed by the abolition of the post of Governor in 1973, when it was presented to the Secretary of State for Northern Ireland.

Design
The seal was designed by Nevile Wilkinson, the Ulster King of Arms, based on the Great Seal of the Realm but with the royal coat of arms bearing an escutcheon with a red cross on a gold field, the basis of the historical coat of arms of Ulster and the sinister banner on the coat of arms of Northern Ireland, also designed by Wilkinson. The first Great Seal of Northern Ireland was provided in time for the state opening of the 1924 session of the Northern Ireland Parliament. Prior to this, the Governor of Northern Ireland (James Hamilton, 3rd Duke of Abercorn) used his private seal instead, as permitted by the 1922 act. The 1924 seal had an image of the reigning monarch, George V. The British practice is to strike a new seal for a new monarch, but Edward VIII abdicated before his Northern Ireland seal had been struck, and the 1924 seal was not replaced until 1938 with one for George VI.

The new seal for Elizabeth II was delivered to the Governor, John Loder, 2nd Baron Wakehurst, on 5 November 1953 at a meeting of Privy Council of Northern Ireland, whereupon the obsolete seal was ceremonially defaced with a hammer by the Clerk of the Council and gifted to the Governor. In 1985 the 1924 great seal was acquired by the National Heritage Memorial Fund for the Ulster Museum.

Uses
Letters patent by the monarch under the Great Seal of Northern Ireland are used for the following:
 Senior judicial appointments to the courts of Northern Ireland, including the Lord Chief Justice, Lords Justice of Appeal, and High Court judges.
 Royal assent to bills of the Northern Ireland Assembly.

All justices of the peace for Northern Ireland are appointed under a single commission of the peace; the commission was issued under the Great Seal of Northern Ireland, whereas the instrument appointing a justice is issued by the Department of Justice without the seal.

Wafer seals

The Northern Ireland (Miscellaneous Provisions) Act 1945 authorised the preparation and use of a die bearing the same device as the obverse of the seal, and the impression embossed by means of the die on, or on a wafer or other material attached to, a document confers on the document the same validity in all respects as if it had been authenticated by, or passed under, the Great Seal itself. Section 49 of the Northern Ireland Act 1998 makes similar provision for the creation of wafer versions of the Great Seal of Northern Ireland, which is valid for use on letters patent signifying royal assent to bills of the Northern Ireland Assembly. The wafer seals are used by the First Minister and Deputy-First Minister acting jointly.

List of Keepers of the Great Seal of Northern Ireland
The following are Keepers of the Great Seal, who served as Governor of Northern Ireland (1922–1973):
1922 James Hamilton, 3rd Duke of Abercorn
1945 William Leveson-Gower, 4th Earl Granville
1952 John Loder, 2nd Baron Wakehurst
1964 John Erskine, 1st Baron Erskine of Rerrick
1968 Ralph Grey, Baron Grey of Naunton

The following are Keepers of the Great Seal, who served as Secretary of State for Northern Ireland (1973–present):
1973: William Whitelaw
1973: Francis Pym
1974: Merlyn Rees
1976: Roy Mason
1979: Humphrey Atkins
1981: Jim Prior
1984: Douglas Hurd
1985: Tom King
1989: Peter Brooke
1992: Sir Patrick Mayhew
1997: Mo Mowlam
1999: Peter Mandelson
2001: John Reid
2002: Paul Murphy
2005: Peter Hain also Welsh Secretary
2007: Shaun Woodward
2010: Owen Paterson
2012: Theresa Villiers
2016: James Brokenshire
2018: Karen Bradley
2019: Julian Smith
2020: Brandon Lewis
2022: Shailesh Vara
2022: Chris Heaton-Harris

See also
 Great Seal of the Irish Free State
 Great Seal of the Realm

References

Ireland, Northern
Government of Northern Ireland
Law of Northern Ireland
Symbols introduced in 1924
1924 establishments in Northern Ireland